EADS 3 Sigma is the name since 2002 (when its majority was acquired by the European EADS Group) of the Greek 3 Sigma aerospace company. It was founded in 1987 with headquarters in Athens and production facilities in Chania, Crete. It has designed, produced and exported a variety of Unmanned Aerial Vehicles - including the Iris, Alkyon, Perseas (also available with single- and twin-jet engines), and 3 Sigma Nearchos types - as well as various electronics; its areas of research and development, in collaboration with Greek Universities, have included engine and remote control technologies.

EADS 3 Sigma announced in November 2012 that the company was in liquidation as it was no longer financially viable to continue its operations.

External links/References 
L.S. Skartsis, "Greek Vehicle & Machine Manufacturers 1800 to present: A Pictorial History", Marathon (2012)  (eBook)
https://web.archive.org/web/20091212070405/http://www.eads-3sigma.gr/

Former Airbus subsidiaries and divisions
Aircraft manufacturers of Greece
Defence companies of Greece
Greek brands
Defunct manufacturing companies of Greece
Manufacturing companies based in Athens